Austrokatanga monteithi is a species of assassin bug, the sole member of its genus, in the subfamily Ectrichodiinae of Reduviidae. This species is found in Australia.

References

Reduviidae
Hemiptera of Australia